The Eastern Orthodox Church is opposed to the Roman Catholic doctrine of papal supremacy. While not denying that primacy does exist for the Bishop of Rome, Eastern Orthodox Christians argue that the tradition of Rome's primacy in the early Church was not equivalent to the current doctrine of supremacy.

Eastern Orthodox understanding of Catholicity

The test of authentic catholicity is adherence to the authority of the Church's Holy Tradition, and then to the witness of Sacred "Scripture", which is itself a product of the Church's aforementioned Holy Tradition. It is not defined by adherence to any particular see. It is the position of the Eastern Orthodox Church that it has never accepted the pope as de jure leader of the entire church. All bishops are equal "as Peter", therefore every church under every bishop (consecrated in apostolic succession) is fully complete (the original meaning of catholic).

Referring to Ignatius of Antioch, Carlton says

The church is in the image of the Trinity and reflects the reality of the incarnation.

Any changes to the understanding of the church would reflect a change in the understanding of the Trinity.

Eastern Orthodox rebuttal of Catholic arguments

It is the position of Orthodox Christianity that Roman Catholic arguments in support of the teaching have relied on proofs from Fathers that have either been misinterpreted or so taken out of context as to misrepresent their true intent. It is the position of Orthodox Christianity that a closer examination of those supposed supports would have the effect of either not supporting the argument or have the opposite effect of supporting the counter-argument.

Apostolic Throne

Athanasius is used as a witness for papal primacy on numerous Catholic apologist sites.

Whelton however says that Athanasius does not use the definite article (the) in the text.

Rome is an Apostolic throne, not the Apostolic throne.

Pope Leo XIII

Augustine

Whelton goes on to say that for Augustine there is not one Apostolic See, but many:

Ignatius of Antioch

For Ignatius each church under a bishop is complete – the original meaning of "catholic". For Ignatius the church is a world-wide unity of many communities. Each has at its center a bishop "who draws together the local community in the Eucharistic celebration." This then is the unity of the church – each church united to its bishop – each of these churches united to each other. There is no evidence of him accepting a single supreme bishop-of-bishops as the bishop's authority is localised to a particular church. C. Carlton sums up Ignatius's view of the bishop's role in the Church this way:

Ignatius sets out what he believes consists of the church in an epistle to the Trallians:

There is no reference to another tier above bishop. For Ignatius, the bishop is supreme, not the bishop because he is in communion with the bishop in Rome.

Thus when he writes to Polycarp, the bishop of Smyrna, he states that God is Polycarp’s bishop, implying that there is no intermediary between the local bishop and God.

John Chrysostom referred to Ignatius of Antioch as a "teacher equivalent to Peter".

Letter to the Romans
Ignatius' Epistle to the Romans is used by Catholic apologists to suggest Roman primacy. In particular his opening remarks:

J.H. Srawley concedes that the Roman church presides but argues that it is unclear as to what area the act of presiding ("presides in the place of the region of the Romans" and "presides over love") refers to. He argues that the act of presiding may be simply of those churches in the region of the Romans, that is, those in Italy.

Tome of Leo
Often cited as a proof of Papal Supremacy is the Tome of Leo which is a letter sent by Pope Leo to the Fourth Ecumenical Council, Chalcedon in 451. It in part seems to suggest that Leo speaks with the authority of Peter. It is the position of Orthodox Christianity that the approval of the Tome is simply to state a unity of faith, not only of the pope but other churchmen as well.
Before the Tome of Leo was presented to the Council, it was submitted to a committee headed by Patriarch St. Anatolius of Constantinople for study. The committee compared the Tome of Leo to the 12 Anathemas of St. Cyril of Alexandria against Nestorius and declared the Tome orthodox. It was then presented to the council for approval. 

However it is not just Leo's teaching that is the teaching of the Apostle, but Cyril's teaching as well. Both teach as Peter. The same language was used following the reading of Cyril's letter at the council. The language of the council is simply to reinforce that all believe. At the Third Ecumenical Council Pope Celestine and Cyril were compared to Paul.

John Chrysostom

Another apparent witness for supremacy claims is John Chrysostom. This evidence is supposed to be based on an incident when he faced exile and he appealed to the pope for help. When he was to be exiled he appealed to the pope for help, as well as two other western prelates; Venerius of Milan and Chromatius of Aquileia. He appealed to all three in the same terms rather than viewing the pope as leader.

In 2007 Pope Benedict XVI also spoke of this:

Historian J. N. D Kelly wrote:

The pope took up the cause of John Chrysostom, convoking a western synod to investigate the matter. They found in favor of John Chrysostom and sent delegates to Constantinople but these were ignored and sent back after only three months. The pope's findings in support of John Chrysostom were not viewed as serious enough to annul John Chrysostom's exile.

It must also be remembered that he took his vows from Meletius (whom we noted earlier was not in communion with Rome). He accepted as an authority men not in communion with Rome. After Meletius died John Chrysostom accepted Flavian as his bishop - another person not in communion with Rome. John Chrysostom spent much of his life not in communion with Rome.

Other texts are used to allege he supported Roman primacy. John Chrysostom sometimes ascribes to Peter greatness.

This would seem to indicate that Chrysostom taught that Peter was the supreme ruler over the "brethren". He goes on to ascribe Peter as the "teacher of the world".

However, according to Abbé Guettée on other occasions John Chrysostom ascribes the same titles to others:

Denny also notes that John Chrysostom goes on to speak of Paul as being on an equal footing with Peter. Further, the Catholic encyclopedia offers this frank admission of his writings:

Basil the Great

Basil the Great also supported Meletius against Rome's candidate. Writing to Count Terentius Basil said

From his letters it appears that Basil did not hold the popes in high esteem. When Basil wrote to the west for help (in combating Arianism) he addressed his letters to the whole western church. He didn't especially write to Rome for help and did not even list it first.

Damasus was the leader of a group supporting the heretic Marcellus

Of the pope, St Basil wrote

Coryphæus

Coryphæus means the head of the choir. Catholic apologists note that John Chrysostom uses the term to describe Peter. However he also uses this term in relation to others:

It is argued by Catholics that John Chrysostom only uses the singular Coryphæus in relation to Peter. This is true, but others do not restrict the use of the singular to Peter.

Basil also uses the term Coryphæus. He refers to Athanasius as "Coryphæus of all."

He refers to Pope Damasus as Coryphæus, but as the leader of the westerners, not of the whole church.

Hesychius of Jerusalem uses the term Coryphæus to refer to James.

Maximus the Confessor

Pope Leo XIII has already been shown to have misquoted Athanasius. Whelton states that (in his encyclical Satis cognitum) he misquotes Maximus the Confessor. In Defloratio ex Epistola ad Petrum illustrem  Maximus (also rendered Maximos) is alleged to have said:

Edward Denny giving his own translation and using that of Vincenzi shows that the words of Maximus give Rome a power conferred upon it by Holy Synods. This is in contrast with Catholic teaching and also would suggest that if a synod can confer power, it can also take it away. Denny states that Vincenzi is "compelled by the facts to admit that these very authorities to which St Maximus refers, as they have been handed down to us, are witness against the Papal Monarchy."

Formula of Pope Hormisdas

Under the emperor Anastasius I, the churches of Constantinople and Rome were in schism. However with the ascendency of the orthodox emperor Justin I, the two churches could be reconciled again. Justin ordered negotiations begin.

Pope Hormisdas issued a formula of orthodox catholic faith which the Patriarch John II could sign if he wished reunion of the two churches. It can namely be read in the formula:

Catholic apologists emphasize part of the text bolded above.

Those in agreement with orthodox faith would naturally be in agreement with the church in Rome on this matter – which was stating orthodox faith. For Catholic apologists agreement to this text means an agreement to Rome, because Rome is the leader. For Orthodox agreement to Rome is because it stated the truth.

Further evidence seems to point to this. Patriarch John expressed his opinion that Rome (Old Rome) and Constantinople (New Rome) were on the same level. The Patriarch showed this when he added to the document:

Furthermore despite it being one of the demands in the formula the east continued to disregard papal demands by not condemning Acacius.

The politics of this is demonstrated by the fact that the Emperor Justin ignored the pope's candidate for the vacated see of Alexandria and instead "authorised the consecration of Timothy III, an intransigent Monophysite".

Theoderic, king in Italy, and an Arian grew suspicious of the new alliance between Rome and Constantinople. John who succeeded as pope was sent to Constantinople to restore Arian churches there. Thus the orthodox Catholic pope was sent to urge the restoration of churches to heretics. This the pope did with limited success.

Opposition arguments from early church history

 The Church at Rome was founded (or more formally organised) by both Peter and Paul. As no particular charism or primacy attaches to Paul, then it is not from his co-foundation of the church of Rome that the Roman Pontiff claims primacy.
 As many Sees are of Peter, Peter serves as an archetype of "Apostle".
 While the See of Rome had primacy, it was a position of honour rather than power or magisterial authority.
 Rome is an Apostolic throne, not the Apostolic throne.
 Each bishop has the right to manage affairs within his local diocese. In the event of a dispute with another bishop, only a general council may rule on the matter.
 Church Fathers do not refer to another tier or clerical office above the ordinary episcopate.
 Cases which had been decided by Rome were appealed to bishops in other metropolitan areas.
 Cases which had been decided by Rome were appealed to synods of bishops in other metropolitan areas.
 Peter founded many episcopal sees; all such sees have equal standing.
 The Apostles were equal; no authority was withheld from any of them.
 The post-Constantinian church conferred upon the sees of Old Rome and later New Rome (Constantinople) the same degree of honor.
 Eastern Patriarchs have regarded the Bishop of Rome, occupying the only apostolic see in Western Christendom, as the Patriarch of the West (not of the entire church).
 Faced with exile, John Chrysostom, the Archbishop of Constantinople, wrote an appeal for help to three Western churchmen. While one of these was the bishop of Rome, had Rome exercised primacy at that time, he would not have written to the other two bishops.

"Keys of the Kingdom"
Orthodox Christians accept that Peter had a certain primacy. In the New Testament, he is first to be given the keys . Such an interpretation, it is claimed, has been accepted by many Church Fathers; Tertullian, Hilary of Poitiers, John Chrysostom, Augustine.

Council of Jerusalem

The New Testament records the convening of a council to decide whether gentiles who converted should be required to be circumcised, which according to some interpretations was prescribed by the Mosaic law. (Rabbinic Judaism only prescribes Noahide Laws for gentiles.) Catholic historians note that when Peter spoke, all were silent. However Whelton notes that when Paul and James spoke, all were silent as well.

Eusebius said that it was James who stated the decision of the Council, not Peter. John Chrysostom noted James made the decision.

The ruling of the Council was expressed as being the decision of all the council, not just Peter. Continuing with this the opening statements of official formulations normally begins with the phrase "Following the Holy Fathers", not "Following the ruling of the Pope."

Easter controversy

There existed a difference in how some local churches celebrated Easter: in the Roman province of Asia it was celebrated on the 14th of the moon (Quartodecimanism), not necessarily on Sunday. "Bishop Victor of Rome ordered synods to be held to settle the matter – an interesting early instance of synodality and indeed of popes encouraging synods – and excommunicated Polycrates of Ephesus and the bishops of Asia when their synod refused to adopt the Roman line. Victor was rebuked by Irenaeus for this severity and it seems that he revoked his sentence and that communion was preserved."

Eusebius wrote:

The matter will be eventually resolved at the First Ecumenical Council in line with Sunday observance.

Eastern Orthodox arguments from Church Councils

First Ecumenical Council 

Arius and his teachings were condemned by a synod of bishops which the pope summoned in 320. Alexander of Alexandria summoned a local synod in Alexandria in 321 which also condemned Arianism. Five years after the pope had condemned Arianism, Emperor Constantine I called an ecumenical council to settle the matter. Whelton argues that the pope's decision was not considered an end to the matter because a council in Africa met to examine the issue for itself. Constantine then ordered a larger council to decide on the matter.

The Fourth Canon of this council confirmed that bishops were to be appointed only locally.

Second Ecumenical Council 

The Second Ecumenical Council was presided over by Meletius of Antioch, who was not in communion with Rome.

Third Ecumenical Council 

The Third Ecumenical Council called Nestorius to account for his teachings following his condemnation as a heretic by Pope Celestine I. The council did not consider the papal condemnation as definitive.

Bishop Maret said

St Vincent of Lerins

In its condemnation of Nestorius, the language given is of the council ruling, not because the pope said so. Cyril writes that he, and his fellow bishop - the pope - had both condemned Nestorius.

Catholic apologists Fathers Rumble and Carty stated

It is true that the statement was made at the council. It is however not a "decree". It was a statement by a priest during the deliberations of the council. This priest, Philip, was at the council to represent the pope. It was not a decree or finding made by the council and remains his opinion.

Fourth Ecumenical Council 

The Fourth Ecumenical Council was called against the expressed wishes of the pope.

Fifth Ecumenical Council 

A controversy arose out of the writings known as Three Chapters – written by bishops Theodore, Theodoret, and Ibas. Pope Vigilius opposed the condemnation of the Three Chapters. At the Fifth Ecumenical Council (553) the assembled bishops condemned and anathematized Three Chapters. After the council threatened to excommunicate him and remove him from office, Vigilius changed his mind – blaming the devil for misleading him.
Bossuet wrote

German theologian Karl Josef von Hefele notes that the council was called "without the assent of the Pope".

Sixth Ecumenical Council 

At the Sixth Ecumenical Council, both Pope Honorius and Patriarch Sergius I of Constantinople were declared heretics.

The council anathematized them, declared them tools of the devil, and cast them out of the church.

The popes (from Pope Leo II) themselves adhered to the Council's ruling and added Honorius to their list of heretics, before quietly dropping his name in the eleventh century. The Catholic Encyclopedia states:

So too the Seventh Ecumenical Council declared its adhesion to the anathema in its decree of faith. Thus an Ecumenical Council could rule on the faith of a pope and expel him from the church.

Council in Trullo 

The Council in Trullo is considered by some E. Orthodox as a continuation of the sixth.

At this council it was confirmed (in canon 39) that the local church could regulate itself, have its own special laws and regulations.

Council of Sardica 

It is claimed by Catholic apologists that this council offers proof of papal primacy. In particular this reference is used

It is further stated that Athanasius referred to this council as "the Great Council". 

However, this council was not an ecumenical one and not all of it was initially accepted by the east, who in fact refused to attend because of their Arian-leanings and their opposition to Athanasius. Apart from the fact that the council at Sardica was not accepted by the whole church until at least the Council at Trullo hundreds of years later, Sardica had only given to the bishop of Rome jurisdiction as a court of final appeal. Pope Zosimus would later misrepresent the Council of Sardica in order to bolster his claims for power over the churches in Africa.

Additionally some believe the clause "their head, that is, to the See of Peter, the Apostle" to be an interpolation, because of the bad grammar of the Latin.

Western councils

Filioque
In 809, when Pope Leo III was asked to approve the addition to the Nicene Creed of the Filioque, first included by the Third Council of Toledo (589) and later adopted widely in Spain, the Frankish empire and England, he refused:

The claim that Pope John VIII also condemned the addition of the Filioque is disputed. Philip Schaff says there are different opinions about when the addition was accepted in Rome, whether by Pope Nicholas I (858-867), Pope Sergius III (904-911) or, as is most commonly believed, by Pope Benedict VIII (1014–1015). When arguing "that so far from the insertion being made by the Pope, it was made in direct opposition to his wishes and command", he says:

Council of Frankfurt
The Council of Frankfurt was held in 794. "Two papal legates were present, Theophylact and Stephen." Despite the presence of papal representatives it still repudiated the terms of the Seventh Ecumenical Council – despite the fact that the Seventh was accepted by the pope.

Rome's supposed primacy

First pope

The Catholic church states that Rome's supremacy rests on the pope being given power handed down from the first pope – Peter.

However there is evidence that Peter was not the first bishop, and that the church in Rome was founded (or organized) by Peter and Paul together.

That is Linus is entrusted by the Apostles (plural). It is suggested that this evidence means that Linus was pope whilst Peter was still alive. Rome's church could be said to be founded (or organised) on both Peter and Paul.

Primacy based on Peter and Paul

Rome had primacy, but it was one of honor, rather than power. The reasons for this are varied. One being that it was a see founded by both Peter and Paul. This honor was given not because of the 'primacy' of Peter (which is Catholic teaching), but on the position of both Peter and Paul. This was the accepted position, even in the West.

Augustine and Theodoret also wrote on the greatness of Rome – but for being the largest city, and its foundation on Peter and Paul. Rome's degree of 'primacy' was affirmed by one hundred and fifty bishops meeting at the Council of Chalcedon. For this council Rome's primacy rested on the fact it was once the imperial capital.

Canon XXVIII of the Council of Chalcedon

This canon above comes up in numerous discussions on Papal Supremacy. For Orthodox it demonstrates a fluidity to the placing of honors – it shows Constantinople's place of honor moving up higher than older Sees such as Jerusalem, Alexandria and, Antioch.

Pope Leo I protested against the inclusion of this canon and refused to sign agreement to it. The Catholic encyclopaedia says

The pope protested on behalf of two other Sees' privileges, not on a matter of his own power. However despite his energetic protests the canon remained adhered to by the eastern churches. It was confirmed in the east at the Council of Trullo in 692, where the four major eastern patriarchs attended; Paul of Constantinople, Peter of Alexandria, Anastasius of Jerusalem, George of Antioch. Thus despite the wishes of the pope the eastern churches ignored his protests.

Eventually it was accepted in the West. In 1215 at the Fourth Council of the Lateran the Roman church accepted Constantinople's position – albeit when Constantinople was in western hands following the Fourth Crusade. Subsequently at the Council of Florence this was confirmed to the Greek Patriarch of Constantinople.

Rome as an archetype church

The church in Rome is occasionally singled out.

Cyprian

Equality of the Apostles

Peter and Paul taught the same as each other. All the Apostles were the foundation (rock) of the church. Nothing was withheld from any of the Apostles. When they preached they did so with equal knowledge. Peter preached to the Jews as Paul preached to the Gentiles.

Tertullian

John Chrysostomon

Cyril of Alexandria

"Rock"

Orthodox Christians believe all people can share in God. In a process called Theosis. We are all called to be rock. That is to share in the same nature. Thus from the earliest times the foundation of the church can be said to be; the faith; Jesus; the Apostles, not just Peter.

The Shepherd of Hermas:

The Liturgy of St. James:

Peter is referred to as rock but other Christian writers use the term in describing others; Hippolytus of Rome; Victorinus of Pettau; Gregory of Nyssa; Hilary of Poitiers; Jerome;Basil the Great; Gregory Thaumaturgus; Ambrosiaster; Aphraates; Athanasius;
Origen;
John Cassian

The Orthodox Christian position is that all members of the church are called to be 'rock'; just as the church is built on the foundation of all the Apostles, all are called to be stones. Protestant Matthew Henry's bible commentary notes this too when he states

Peter described himself as a fellow elder , placing himself on equal footing with the other disciples.

Peter as "Prince of the Apostles"

Peter is often called the Prince of the Apostles. If such a special title meant that he held a special charism it was not exclusively Rome's. Other Sees had been founded by Peter. Pope Gregory the Great recognised these Sees were all equally as Sees of Peter. There is no difference between the Sees of Peter.

Pope Gregory

Theodoret also refers to other Sees being thrones of Peter.

Peter as the Archetype

As all are called to be rock, and as many Sees are of Peter, Peter serves as an archetype of Apostle. When he receives the keys he represents all of the Apostles. This is found in the writings of Augustine and Cyprian.

Gregory the Great
The pope now holds the title of universal bishop. However such titles once raised the ire of popes.

Pope Gregory the Great heard that Patriarch John the Faster had accepted the title ecumenical patriarch. This simply meant patriarch to the emperor, not 'universal' patriarch.

The pope wrote to the emperor to protest that any one bishop should be accorded the title universal bishop.

Gregory first accords Peter the title prince of the Apostles.

Gregory notes that honor was bestowed upon Peter and the church in Rome – given it by an ecumenical council, but that no one person used the title. It was an honor for all priests. Gregory emphatically says no one person should have such a title.

Pelagianism
During the controversies surrounding Pelagius' heresies a council in Mileve (in Numidia) found against Pelagianism. They then wrote to the pope seeking his help. They gave him much praise

Catholic apologists may make the most of such praise. However in the context of history one must also note that this praise was conditional. The next pope Zosimus did not out-rightly condemn the heresy Pelagianism and was himself condemned by the rest of the church for back-pedalling.

Thus the same church (in Africa) could lavish praise upon the church in Rome but could equally condemn them, depending on the teachings Rome upheld.

Zosimus eventually reconfirmed the decision of Innocent, Pelagius went to the churches in Palestine where a synod was called to hear his case. Augustine says that the churches in Palestine were deceived by Pelagius. What is important though is that even after two popes had condemned him Pelagius could still seek judgment by another region's synod. Evidently the Palestinian churches did not see the condemnation of the church in Rome and the church in Africa as binding.

It would take an ecumenical council to bring the churches to agreement on this matter.

Cyprian
In the encyclical Satis cognitum Pope Leo XIII misquotes Cyprian.

The quotation is taken from Cyrpian's letter to Antonianus who was questioning whether he should be loyal to Cornelius or another claimant to the pontificate Novation. Cornelius selection as bishop of Rome was backed by sixteen bishops. Cyprian stated that Novation

Therefore to adhere to a heretic (Novation) is to separate oneself from the Catholic Church. Furthermore Cyprian confirms here that the one church is divided into many bishoprics throughout the world. He goes on to say in the same letter

Cyprian is used several times in Catholic apologetics.

The Jesuit scholar Bévnot notes…

Cyprian and Augustine

The local church decides for itself
The seventh council of Carthage under Cyprian stated the position that each local church to decide upon matters.

Cyprian was adamant that the popes had no power over him. Cyprian in his dispute believed he was following the teachings of the Apostles. He appealed to what he believed was always taught and this was the faith as maintained by all the Apostles. He addressed Pope Stephen not as his master, but as his equal.

Augustine supports Cyprian
Thus Cyprian's stance does not evidence Papal Supremacy. The pope had condemned this position but one local church continued on with its own matters in the manner it decided. Importantly Augustine, who disagrees with Cyprian's stance on dogma does not condemn Cyprian's manner.

Augustine agreed with Cyprian's right to decide within his local church ... As Michael Whelton observed "He does not condemn Cyprian for refusing to submit to the Bishop of Rome"

Despite the fact that the pope had condemned Cyprian’s position, a general council had not yet ruled on the matter. Augustine recognises this fact.

Augustine is of the belief that Cyprian might have changed his mind if a general (ecumenical) council had been called. He states that a council would have the ultimate say in removing all doubt.
Augustine had elsewhere argued that a council could over-rule a local church - even the church in Rome.

Adherence to the Bishop of Rome was not "necessary" for unity.

St Vincent of Lérins
As Augustine argues that Cyprian would have rejoined orthodox belief following a general council, Vincent of Lérins wrote on what he considered constituted the teachings of the Catholic Church. His opening "General Rule" mentions no adhesion to the Bishop of Rome, rather what is taught by all the church. Hasler sums this up as

This same rule would be used also to argue against Papal infallibility.

Second Council of Lyon 
For Eastern Orthodox, the acceptance of a council relies on two points, it must not only state the faith as always taught, but also be accepted by the whole church. A council can rule and still be rejected by the faithful. Some Catholic historians maintain that the Second Council of Lyon of 1272 shows the churches of the east submitting to Roman authority. It was at this council that the Roman (Byzantine) Emperor Michael endeavored to re-unite the churches (split apart at the Great Schism in 1054).

The delegation who attended from the east however did not represent the churches in the east, but the Emperor himself. They were his personal emissaries.

Historian Steven Runciman notes;

Michael had genuinely wished re-union. His primary fear was not an attack from the Turks, but the fear of a renewed effort by the Latin west against the Empire – one must remember that this is not long after Michael had recaptured Constantinople from the Latin west – which had held it since the Fourth Crusade in 1204. With the failure of this attempt at union through a political solution, Michaels fears were realised when the pope concluded an alliance with Charles of Anjou in 1281. The empire and the dynasty were saved from military intervention only by the Sicilian Vespers, (a rebellion that broke out in Palermo).

See also 
Protestant opposition to papal supremacy

References

Further reading

External links 
 "Rise of the Papacy", ReligionFacts.com

Eastern Orthodox theology
Eastern Orthodoxy-related controversies
Catholicism-related controversies
Papal primacy